The General Union of Moroccan Workers (UGTM) is a national trade union center in Morocco. It was formed March 20, 1960 and has a membership of 695,000.

The UGTM has its roots in the agricultural workers of Morocco, although it does have public and private sector workers as well. ICTUR reports that the UGTM is historically seen as less militant than other federations, but did participate in the demands for reform which occurred in the 1990s.

The UGTM is affiliated with the International Trade Union Confederation.

Leadership 

The following list includes the heads of the UGTM:
 Hashim Amin from March 20, 1960 until 1964.
 Abdulrazzak Avilal from 1964 to 29 January 2006.
 Mohammed Binjaloun Andalsea from 29 January 2006 to 4 December 2008.
 Hameed February 30 January 2009 – 3 September 2012.
 Kafee Al-Shirat from October 2014 to May 21, 2017
 Hameed Shibat from 21 May 2017 – present.

References

External links
 UGTM website.

Trade unions in Morocco
International Trade Union Confederation
Trade unions established in 1960
1960 establishments in Morocco